Over is a village in the civil parish of Almondsbury in South Gloucestershire, England,  north of Bristol.  It lies on the B4055, a road that parallels the M5 from Junction 17 to 16. The road, known locally as Over Lane, abuts to the east a ridge which overlooks the Severn floodplain, dominated by Bristol Golf Club or Course. According to local legends, a ghost of an old woman haunts this place every New Year's Eve.

Over Court had a large deer park, which was largely replaced in the 20th century by the golf venue.

A similar deer park was higher and to the north at Knole Park, the house of which was centred on a small knoll which was a fortified Roman camp. Most of its grounds have been replaced by a large brick quarry, Springwood Nurseries and Almondsbury's paired garden centres which are notable for large outdoor areas.

Beyond the clustered settlement, before the lane climbs to the north it passes over the London to South Wales Main Line, a railway emerging from Patchway Tunnel before heading across the Severn floodplain to the Severn Tunnel. Its main station is Bristol Parkway station a few miles to the southeast. The area is road-dominated and the loss of the deer parks has led to little tourism. In 2015 Pilning it was the sixth least used station in the UK — 68 passenger entries/exits were recorded for the year.

References

External links

Villages in South Gloucestershire District